Montana Highway 72 (MT 72) in the U.S. State of Montana is a route running northerly from the Wyoming state line to an intersection with U.S. Route 310 (US 310) about one mile (1.6 km) south of the town of Bridger, a distance of approximately .  At the state line, the road becomes Wyoming Highway 120, which continues  to the town of Cody.

History

Before receiving its current designation, the portion of Highway 72 north of Belfry was a part of Montana Secondary Highway 308 (S-308), and the segment between Belfry and the Wyoming state line was designated as S-397.

Major intersections

References

 

072
Transportation in Carbon County, Montana